Acrophoca longirostris, sometimes called the swan-necked seal, is an extinct genus of Late Miocene pinniped. It was thought to have been the ancestor of the modern leopard seal, however it is now thought to be a species of monk seal.

Taxonomy
The fossils of A. longirostris have been discovered in the Pisco Formation of Peru and the Bahía Inglesa Formation of Chile. When it was first described in 1981, it was thought to have been closely related to the lobodontine seals which includes the modern day leopard seal (Hydrurga leptonyx), the crabeater seal (Lobodon carcinophaga), the Weddell seal (Leptonychotes weddelli), and the Ross seal (Ommatophoca rossii). However, it is now thought to be a basal species of monk seal of the subfamily Monachinae, closely related to the extinct seal Piscophoca.

Description
 
This may indicate that it spent a lot of time near the coast. Its teeth were built for piercing, implying a diet consisted primarily of fish. However, it also had interdigitated tooth cusps causing the teeth on the upper jaw to fit with the teeth of the lower jaw, which is consistent with filter feeders. Unlike other earless seals, Acrophoca had a long and flexible neck, with an elongated body. The orientation of the pelvis, which in comparison to modern earless seals is everted, as well as adaptations to the hind limbs suggest that swimming was mainly powered by the back flippers. It was less adapted for the sea than the lobodontine seals, suggesting it inhabited nearshore waters.

Paleoecology
Its fossils have been found alongside those of the marine sloth Thalassocnus and tusked cetacean Odobenocetops, as well as modern animals such as bottlenose dolphins, gannets and cormorants.

References

Further reading 
 World Encyclopedia of Dinosaurs & Prehistoric Creatures: The Ultimate Visual Reference To 1000 Dinosaurs And Prehistoric Creatures Of Land, Air And Sea ... And Cretaceous Eras (World Encyclopedia) by Dougal Dixon

External links

True seals
Prehistoric carnivoran genera
Miocene pinnipeds
Zanclean extinctions
Pinnipeds of South America
Miocene mammals of South America
Montehermosan
Huayquerian
Neogene Chile
Neogene Peru
Fossils of Chile
Fossils of Peru
Pisco Formation
Fossil taxa described in 1981